Brisbane Roar Football Club, an association football club based on the Redcliffe Peninsula, Queensland, and was founded in 1957 as Hollandina-Inala. They were one of two Queensland members competing in the inaugural National Soccer League in 1977 and became the first Queensland member admitted into the A-League in 2005, having spent most seasons in Queensland state leagues. The club's first team have competed in numerous nationally and internationally organised competitions, and all players who have played in 100 or more such matches, either as a member of the starting eleven or as a substitute, are listed below.

Matt McKay holds the record for the greatest number of appearances for Brisbane Roar. Between 2005 and 2019 the Australian midfielder played 303 times for the club. As of 2021, three other players have made more than 200 appearances for Brisbane Roar who are Alan Niven, Thomas Broich and Jack Hingert. The club's goalscoring record is held by Besart Berisha, who scored 50 goals in all competitions between 2011 and 2014. He surpassed the previous record of 25 goals in league competition, held by Sergio van Dijk in 2012.

Key
The list is ordered first by date of debut, and then if necessary in alphabetical order.
Appearances as a substitute are included.
Statistics are correct up to and including the match played on 5 March 2022. Where a player left the club permanently after this date, his statistics are updated to his date of leaving.

Players

Players highlighted in bold are still actively playing at Brisbane Roar.

Captains

References
General
 
 
 

Specific

External links
 Brisbane Roar official website

Brisbane Roar FC players
Brisbane Roar
Roar
Association football player non-biographical articles